Jenny Alexis Ryan (born 2 April 1982) is an English quizzer, singer and television personality, best known as one of the six chasers on the ITV game show The Chase.

Career 
Ryan's first quiz show appearance was on University Challenge, helping the University of Leeds to reach the semi-finals in 2003. She also appeared on Mastermind in 2006, choosing the American television series Buffy the Vampire Slayer as her specialist subject, and featured in both series of Are You an Egghead? in 2008 and 2009. She found success on Only Connect as a member of the team The Gamblers, who won the third series of the show in 2010. Additionally, she has made appearances on Fifteen to One and Weakest Link, and worked as a QI Elf.

Ryan wrote questions for game shows. She joined The Chase as a chaser in 2015, making her debut appearance on 2 September. She was recommended for The Chase by Anne Hegerty, as they had both competed together on the same quiz team, where Ryan was the captain of the team. Her nickname on the show is "The Vixen", in reference to her red hair, freckles and ponytail; Bradley Walsh came up with the name and the producers liked it since "vixens are notoriously clever and cunning". She is also referred to as "The Bolton Brainiac" and more recently "The Bolton Bombshell" for her place of birth.

In 2017, Ryan appeared alongside fellow chasers Anne Hegerty, Shaun Wallace and Mark Labbett on Let's Sing and Dance for Comic Relief. They won the competition, performing a Wizard of Oz medley.

In 2018 Ryan, along with comedian Lucy Porter, launched in 2018 Fingers On Buzzers, a podcast about quiz and game shows. The duo appeared on Richard Herring's Leicester Square Theatre Podcast in early 2019, where they discussed Fingers On Buzzers and other topics.

In July 2019, Ryan appeared on the 14th series of Celebrity MasterChef. In October 2019, she began competing in The X Factor: Celebrity. She was initially eliminated before the live shows, with heavy criticism of this decision from viewers leading to her being asked back to join the live shows. She went on to reach the final and finished in third place.

Filmography

References

External links 
 Official website
 

1982 births
Living people
Quiz championship players
21st-century English women singers
21st-century English singers
Women television personalities
Contestants on British game shows
Contestants on University Challenge
English television personalities
Participants in British reality television series
LGBT women
People from Bolton